The 2015 Rugby Championship was the fourth edition of the expanded annual southern hemisphere Rugby Championship consisting of Argentina, Australia, South Africa and New Zealand.

The 2015 Championship was a shorter competition than normal, with each team playing each other once, rather than twice (home and away). This was so that teams had a longer preparation time ahead of the 2015 Rugby World Cup which started on 18 September. However, New Zealand hosted an additional match against Australia in Auckland on 15 August which acted as the second Bledisloe Cup test and as a World Cup warm-up. Argentina hosted a second match against South Africa on the same date.

The tournament was known for sponsorship reasons as The Castle Rugby Championship in South Africa, The Investec Rugby Championship in New Zealand, The Castrol Edge Rugby Championship in Australia and The Personal Rugby Championship in Argentina.

Australia won the Championship, becoming just the second team to win the tournament since 2012. However, including the previous format of the Championship, Australia claimed the title for the first time since 2011, and achieved a 100% win rate for the first time ever in either format.	
	
South Africa finished bottom of the table. This was also the first ever year that South Africa failed to record a single win in either the Rugby Championship or Tri Nations Series.

Standings

Fixtures

Week 1

Notes:
 Waisake Naholo and Codie Taylor made their international debuts for New Zealand.

Notes:
 Jesse Kriel made his international debut for South Africa.
 Matt Giteau, being named in the starting XV, became the first overseas based player to play for the Wallabies, by virtue of their new selection policy. Drew Mitchell also based overseas, played off the bench.
 Australia won the Mandela Challenge Plate for the first time since 2012.
 Australia earned their first ever opening fixture of the Rugby Championship.

Week 2

Notes:
 Vincent Koch and Lionel Mapoe made their international debuts for South Africa.
 James Broadhurst and Lima Sopoaga made their international debuts for New Zealand.
 New Zealand retain the Freedom Cup.
 With this loss, South Africa lose three consecutive matches for the first time since 2011.

Notes:
 Juan Pablo Socino made his international debut for Argentina.
 Kurtley Beale earned his 50th test cap for Australia.
 Australia win the Puma Trophy.
 With this win, Australia went top of the Rugby Championship table for the first ever time.

Week 3

Notes:
 Nehe Milner-Skudder made his international debut for New Zealand.
 Richie McCaw equalled Brian O'Driscoll's 141-cap record, as the most capped rugby player ever.
 Australia beat New Zealand for the first time since their 25–20 win in 2011, while earning their first win at Stadium Australia since 2011.
 New Zealand lose their first ever match in the Rugby Championship without claiming a losing bonus point; their last was during the 2011 Tri Nations Series.

Notes:
 This was Argentina's first ever win over South Africa.
 Argentina claim their first ever bonus point victory, and their first away victory, since joining the Rugby Championship in 2012.
 With this loss, South Africa lost consecutive home Test matches for the first time since 2010–11; and lost four consecutive Test matches for the first time since 2010.
 Juan Imhoff scored Argentina's first hat-trick of tries in the Rugby Championship; and the first hat-trick by any player in the tournament since Israel Folau scored three for Australia against Argentina in 2013.

Squads

Summary

Note: Ages, caps and domestic side are of 17 July 2015 – the starting date of the tournament.

Argentina
Argentina's 36-man squad for the Championship, was announced on 26 June 2015.

On 29 March, Juan Pablo Orlandi was called up to the squad to replace the injured Ramiro Herrera.

Australia
On 2 July 2015, Michael Cheika named an extended 40-man squad for the 2015 Rugby Championship. The squad included newly eligible players Matt Giteau and Drew Mitchel, both based at Toulon, France, and uncapped Fijian duo Samu Kerevi and Taqele Naiyaravoro who are eligible through residency.

On 5 July, Henry Speight withdrew from the squad due to compassionate leave, and he was replaced with Nick Cummins.

New Zealand
On 21 June 2015, New Zealand named a 41-man squad for the July 8 clash with Samoa, won by the All Blacks 25–16, the 2015 Rugby Championship and the Bledisloe Cup test on 15 August.

Nepo Laulala and Andrew Ellis are included in the squad as injury cover for Charlie Faumuina and Tawera Kerr-Barlow.

On 2 August, Patrick Osborne was added to the squad ahead the back to back clashes against Australia.

South Africa
On 12 July 2015, coach Heyneke Meyer named the following 31-man squad for the 2015 Rugby Championship:

On 20 July, Flip van der Merwe was added to the squad as injury cover for the second row. Heinrich Brüssow and Cornal Hendricks were also included in the squad to face  in their second Rugby Championship match.

On 5 August, Jean de Villiers, Siya Kolisi, Marcel van der Merwe and Pieter-Steph du Toit were added to the squad ahead of the final match against Argentina.

‡ denotes players who are centrally contracted to the South African Rugby Union.

Statistics

Points scorers

Try scorers

See also
 History of rugby union matches between Argentina and Australia
 History of rugby union matches between Argentina and New Zealand
 History of rugby union matches between Argentina and South Africa
 History of rugby union matches between Australia and South Africa
 History of rugby union matches between Australia and New Zealand
 History of rugby union matches between New Zealand and South Africa

References

2014
2015 in New Zealand rugby union
2015 in South African rugby union
2015 in Australian rugby union
2015 rugby union tournaments for national teams
2015 in Argentine rugby union